United Nations Security Council resolution 568, adopted on 26 July 1985, after expressing its outrage and concern at the suffering caused by the apartheid system in South Africa, the Council further condemned the repressive policies of the apartheid system including murders and forced removals, as well as the state of emergency imposed in 36 districts in the country, demanding it be lifted immediately.

The Council went on to call for the release of all political prisoners in the country, including Nelson Mandela, and that the establishment of a free, democratic society can lead to a solution. It also urged Member States to, in addition to the compulsory arms embargo, participate in restrictions on investments, maritime and aerial relations, sport and cultural relations, and probitation of the sale of krugerrands, commending Member States that had already adopted such procedures.

Finally, Resolution 569 requested the Secretary-General to issue a report on the implementation of the current resolution.

The resolution was adopted by 13 votes to none, with abstentions from the United Kingdom and United States.

See also
 Internal resistance to South African apartheid
 List of United Nations Security Council Resolutions 501 to 600 (1982–1987)
 Apartheid

References
Text of the Resolution at undocs.org

External links
 

 0569
1985 in South Africa
 0569
July 1985 events